Tibet House is an international, loosely affiliated group of nonprofit, cultural preservation organizations founded at the request of the Dalai Lama, to preserve, present, and protect Tibet's ancient traditions of philosophy, mind science, art, and culture due to the Chinese invasion of Tibet in 1950 and subsequent Tibetan diaspora. The first Tibet House was founded in New Delhi, India in 1965.

Tibet Houses include:

 Tibet House, in New Delhi, India founded in 1965. Tulkus Gelek Rimpoche and Dagyab Kyabgoen Rinpoche were early directors. Geshe Lhakdor was a translator and research assistant from 1986 to 1989. The house was designed by Shiv Nath Prasad in 1970 in the Brutalist architecture style. The current director is Geshe Dorjee Damdul.
 Tibet House Japan, founded in 1975 in Shinjuku, Tokyo. 
 Tibet House US was founded in 1987 by scholar Robert Thurman, actor Richard Gere and composer Philip Glass in downtown Manhattan, New York City. Menla, a retreat space located in the Catskills near Phoenicia, New York, is an offshoot of Tibet House US. The project was spearheaded by Robert Thurman and Nena Thurman.   
 Casa Tibet México, founded in 1989 in Mexico City.
 Casa del Tibet Barcelona, founded in 1994 in Spain.
 Tibet House Trust, founded in 1994 in London, England.
 Tibet Haus Germany, founded by Spiritual Director Dagyab Kyabgoen Rinpoche in 2005, in Frankfurt. and
 Tibet House Moscow, founded in 2004 in Russia.
 Tibet House Brasil, in São Paulo, Brazil.

Its stated purpose, as taken from the Tibet House US website:

 To present Tibet's ancient traditions of art and culture by means of creating a permanent Cultural Center, with Gallery, Library, and Archives, and developing traveling exhibitions, print publications and media productions
 To preserve and restore Tibet's unique cultural and spiritual heritage, by means of developing a Repatriation Collection for future repatriation of outstanding examples of Tibetan art, creating an archive of rare photographs, opening a research library, making a Web site on the Internet for the wide distribution of information, and providing support to conservation activities both inside and outside of Tibet
 To share with the world Tibet's practical systems of spiritual philosophy and mind sciences, and its arts of human development, intercultural dialogues, nonviolence, and peacemaking, by means of innovative programs in cooperation with educational and other cultural institutions.

See also
 List of organizations of Tibetans in exile
 Central Tibetan Administration
 Sinicization of Tibet
 Annexation of Tibet by the People's Republic of China
 Battle of Chamdo
 History of Tibet (1950–present)
 Tibetan diaspora
 Tibetan sovereignty debate

References

External links

 Tibet House New Delhi, India
 Tibet House Japan
 Tibet House US
 Casa Tibet, Mexico
 Casa del Tibet Barcelona
 Tibet House, London
 Tibethaus, Frankfurt, Germany
 Tibet House Moscow, Russia
 Tibet House Brasil

1965 establishments in Delhi
Organizations established in 1965
Human rights organisations based in India
Art museums and galleries in New Delhi
Art museums and galleries in Mexico City
Art museums and galleries in Barcelona
Art museums and galleries in London
Art museums and galleries in Tokyo
Art museums and galleries in Moscow
Asian art museums
Ethnic museums
Society museums
Historic preservation organizations
Tibetology
Tibetan-American culture
Art museums and galleries in New York City
Asian art museums in New York (state)
Ethnic museums in New York City
Museums in Manhattan
Cultural studies organizations
Cultural heritage of China
Intangible Cultural Heritage of Humanity
Conservation and restoration organizations